Nam Kuzhandai is a 1955 Indian Tamil-language film directed by K. S. Gopalakrishnan. The film stars R. S. Manohar and S. Varalakshmi.

Cast
List adapted from the database of Film News Anandan

Male cast
R. S. Manohar
N. S. Krishnan
V. Nagayya
A. P. Nagarajan
V. M. Ezhumalai
Female Cast
S. Varalakshmi
T. A. Mathuram
Kumari Lakshmi
Lakshmiprabha

Production
The film was produced by W. M. S. Thambu and was directed by K. S. Gopalakrishnan. P. D. Mathur was in-charge of cinematography while V. B. Nataraja Mudaliar did the editing. Still photography was by R. N. Nagaraja Rao.

Soundtrack
Music was composed by M. D. Parthasarathy while the lyrics were penned by Thanjai N. Ramaiah Dass and Puratchidasan. Singers are V. Nagayya, N. S. Krishnan and S. Varalakshmi and the playback singers are M. S. Anuradha, V. N. Sundaram, U. R. Jeevarathinam, C. S. Pandian, Kothamangalam Seenu, N. L. Ganasaraswathi and Ghantasala.

Notes

References

Indian drama films
Indian black-and-white films
1950s Tamil-language films
Films scored by M. D. Parthasarathy